Reggie Blake Ritter (born January 23, 1960) is a former Major League Baseball pitcher who played for two seasons. He played for the Cleveland Indians from 1986 to 1987, pitching in 19 career games.  He attended Henderson State University where he starred as a designated hitter and a pitcher.  Reggie was elected into the HSU Hall of Honor in 2002 and is the only HSU graduate to ever pitch in the Major Leagues.

Reggie was struck in the face by a line drive off the bat of Juan Benequez while pitching against the Toronto Blue Jays on August 7, 1987.  Reggie suffered a broken jaw and received over 30 stitches in his chin.  He was placed on the 30-day DL and when he returned to the roster he had lost over 30 pounds.  Reggie continued to battle back from his injury but never made it back to the big leagues and he retired in 1990 after playing for the Detroit Tigers organization and the Chicago Cub organization.

Reggie is currently a Financial Advisor for Merrill Lynch in Hot Springs Arkansas since 2007.

External links

1960 births
Living people
Major League Baseball pitchers
Cleveland Indians players
Henderson State Reddies baseball players
Baseball players from Arkansas
People from Malvern, Arkansas